The Northern Counties Committee (NCC) Class X was a solitary diesel-hydraulic shunting (switcher) locomotive built by Harland and Wolff (H&W) for service in the NCC's yards and at Belfast docks. It was one of several pioneering designs of diesel locomotive produced by H&W under their Harlandic trademark during the 1930s and 1940s.

History
There was only one member of Class X, No.17. It was built by Harland and Wolff in Belfast and delivered to the NCC in 1936 under a lease arrangement; it was not actually taken into stock until 1941 when the NCC purchased it. No.17 had an 0-6-0 wheel arrangement and was powered by an eight-cylinder diesel engine developing  at 1200 rpm.

Transmission was via a torque converter and a jackshaft final drive mounted ahead of the leading coupled wheels. As delivered, it had its maker's trade name Harlandic on a plate just below the front headlight.

No.17 spent its career working out of the limelight on the Belfast Harbour Commissioners’ lines at Belfast and within the NCC's own yards. It survived Ulster Transport Authority (UTA) ownership and entered Northern Ireland Railways stock in 1967 but saw little or no work before it was scrapped in mid-1970.

Livery
Under NCC ownership, No.17 was painted black with red bufferbeams. It had brass number plates with red backgrounds which bore a highly stylised "17" in the same manner as the NCC steam engines. The initials "NCC" were applied to the side panels in shaded gold serif capitals.

When the UTA took over, No.17 was repainted black with vermilion and yellow lining. The UTA roundel replaced the "NCC" on the side panels.

References
 
 
 

X
Diesel locomotives of Northern Ireland
C locomotives
5 ft 3 in gauge locomotives
Scrapped locomotives
Diesel-hydraulic locomotives